Lucy Pearl was an American R&B supergroup formed in 1999. The group was composed of Raphael Saadiq (formerly of Tony! Toni! Toné!), Dawn Robinson (formerly of En Vogue), and Ali Shaheed Muhammad (formerly of A Tribe Called Quest).

History
In 1998, Saadiq departed from his group Tony! Toni! Toné!. The following year, Saadiq contacted Ali Shaheed Muhammad and Dawn Robinson with the idea of forming a new supergroup. After Muhammad and Robinson accepted Saadiq's offer, the group officially formed and began recording an album under the group name Lucy Pearl.

In May 2000, Lucy Pearl released their self-titled album on Beyond Music. The album's lead single "Dance Tonight", released in March 2000, charted in top 40 on the Billboard Hot 100 chart and in the top five on R&B chart. The song was also nominated for Best R&B Performance by a Duo or Group at the 43rd Grammy Awards. In August 2000, the album Lucy Pearl became certified gold by the Recording Industry Association of America. In September 2000, the group released their second single "Don't Mess with My Man" which received chart success outside of the United States. In October 2000, Robinson left the group.

In November 2000, Lucy Pearl appeared on the BET show 106 & Park to announce the new addition of singer Joi to the lineup. The group also debuted their music video for the single "Without You". After the release of the final single "You", Lucy Pearl disbanded in late 2001. Both Robinson and Saadiq continue to perform Lucy Pearl songs during their individual tour sets. 

In 2009, a reunion was attempted but failed after Muhammad started a lawsuit against Saadiq. Robinson declined the reunion after Saadiq initially refused to move forward with the release of the Lucy Pearl album in 1999, which caused Robinson to lose her home. Robinson also cited Saadiq's jealousy towards herself and Muhammad as another reason for declining a reunion. In 2020, Robinson participated in various interviews, discussing Lucy Pearl. Robinson explained that the group was originally formed to do one album and after their tour was complete, the group had already agreed to disband. Robinson also alleged that she didn't know she was replaced until being contacted for an interview by a Rolling Stone magazine journalist and later saw Saadiq and Muhammad along with Joi on the television show 106 & Park.

Members
 Raphael Saadiq (1999–2001)
 Dawn Robinson (1999–2000)
 Ali Shaheed Muhammad (1999-2001)
 Joi (2000-2001)

Discography

Albums

Singles

Awards and nominations

2001 43rd Grammy Awards

Best R&B Vocal Performance by a Duo or Group "Dance Tonight" - Lucy Pearl (nominated)

2001 28th American Music Awards

Favorite Soul/R&B Band/Duo/Group Lucy Pearl (nominated)

2000 15th Soul Train Music Awards

Best R&B/Soul Single - Group, Band or Duo   "Dance Tonight" - Lucy Pearl (nominated)

Best R&B/Soul Album - Group Band or Duo   "Lucy Pearl" - Lucy Pearl (nominated)

References

African-American musical groups
American neo soul singers
Contemporary R&B supergroups